Thomas Kelly (March 17, 1871 – December 17, 1920) was a private serving in the United States Army during the Spanish–American War who received the Medal of Honor for bravery.

Biography
Kelly was born in Ireland sometime prior to 1898 and after immigrating to the United States, entered the army from New York City. He was sent to fight in the Spanish–American War with Company H, 21st U.S. Infantry as a private where he received the Medal of Honor for his actions.

He died December 17, 1920, and is buried in Plattsburg Barracks Post Cemetery Plattsburgh, New York.

Medal of Honor citation
Rank and organization: Private, Company H, 21st U.S. Infantry. Place and date: At Santiago de Cuba, 1 July 1898. Entered service at: New York, N.Y. Birth: Ireland. Date of issue: 22 June 1899.

Citation:

Gallantly assisted in the rescue of the wounded from in front of the lines and while under heavy fire from the enemy.

See also

 List of Medal of Honor recipients for the Spanish–American War

References

External links
 
 

1871 births
1920 deaths
19th-century Irish people
Irish soldiers in the United States Army
United States Army Medal of Honor recipients
United States Army soldiers
American military personnel of the Spanish–American War
Irish emigrants to the United States (before 1923)
Burials in New York (state)
Irish-born Medal of Honor recipients
Spanish–American War recipients of the Medal of Honor